The Tunguska event was an explosion that occurred on 30 June 1908, in the Siberian region of Russia, possibly caused by a meteor air burst. The event has inspired much speculation and appears in various fictional works.

Literature 

 In Larry Niven's 1975 novelette The Borderland of Sol, the Tunguska event is proposed to have been caused by the passage through the Earth of a microscopic quantum black hole with the mass of a small asteroid, which then headed back into space and traveled to the outskirts of the Solar System, where it was located 800 years later.
 Soviet engineer and science fiction writer Alexander Kazantsev in his novel Burning Island mentions the event as the crash site of an alien spaceship, resulting in the discovery of radium-delta, the supposed fuel of the ship. His short story "A Visitor From Outer Space", written in 1946, describes the crash site and eyewitness accounts in detail. In this story a nuclear-powered Martian spaceship, seeking fresh water from Lake Baikal, blows up in mid-air. His story "The Explosion" includes the theory that the Tunguska event was the result of the activities of extraterrestrial beings, including an exploding alien spaceship or an alien weapon fired to "save the Earth from an imminent threat". Many events in Kazantsev's tale, which was intended as pure fantasy, were subsequently confused with the actual occurrences at Tunguska.

Cartoons and comics 

 Prog 81 of 2000 AD had a Tharg's Future Shock short story where a ship went back in time to view the Tunguska event. When it arrived in 1908, the ship went out of control, entered the atmosphere and became the cause of the event.

TV and film 

 Siberia is an American supernatural drama television series shot in the style of a reality television show where 16 contestants must survive in the Siberian territory of Tunguska, about 100 years after the Tunguska event. Shortly after arrival, the contestants notice strange things and are abandoned by the production of the reality show. 
 The television series The Secret KGB UFO Files (Phenomenon: The Lost Archives) in 1998, broadcast on Turner Network Television, referred to the Tunguska event as "the Russian Roswell" and claimed that crashed UFO debris had been recovered from the site.
 In the Doctor Who episode "In the Forest of the Night", the Doctor mentions the Tunguska event as an example of where rapid tree growth helped save humanity.
 Target…Earth? is a 1981 documentary exploring the Tunguska event while discussing several possible causes.  It was directed by Joost van Rees, written by Iris van Rees, and stars Victor Buono as Homer the Archivist. Homer, along with his computer assistant INO (I Know), researches the history of the Tunguska event in relation to current events of the day, while watching interviews with various experts. Interviewees include Alexander Kazantsev, Bernard Carr, Carl Sagan, Eugene Shoemaker, Fred Whipple, Frank Drake, George Wald, Harvey Nininger, Jerry Pournelle, Larry Niven, Peter Millman, Philip Morrison and Willard Libby.

Songs 
 The tenth track on Isao Tomita's 1978 album "The Bermuda Triangle" is titled "The Dazzling Cylinder That Crashed In Tunguska, Siberia (Prokofiev: Symphony No. 6: First Movement)"
 The second single from the 2018 Hopesfall album Arbiter is titled Tunguska. “Yesterday, we actually engaged someone on Twitter about a Ghostbusters reference to the Great Siberian Tunguska of 1908,” vocalist Jay Forrest says. “The song is referencing the real phenomenon.”

References

External links 

 Secret Files: Tunguska

Topics in popular culture
Impact events in fiction
Russia in fiction